Fernando Canales may refer to:

Fernando Canales (swimmer) (born 1959), swimming coach, originally from Puerto Rico
Fernando Canales Clariond (born 1946), former governor of Nuevo León, Mexico and former Mexican Secretary of Energy
Fernando Canales (footballer) (born 1995), Peruvian footballer, Universidad de San Martín